Acaciella angustissima var. suffrutescens is a perennial shrub native to Arizona, United States. Acaciella angustissima var. suffrutescens range map in the U.S.

References

angustissima var. suffrutescens
Shrubs